The 1988 United States presidential election in North Carolina took place on November 8, 1988, and was part of the 1988 United States presidential election. Voters chose 13 representatives, or electors to the Electoral College, who voted for president and vice president.

North Carolina strongly voted for the Republican nominee, Vice President George H. W. Bush, over the Democratic nominee, Massachusetts governor Michael Dukakis. The final margin was 57.97% to 41.71%, which compared to the other southern states, was close to the southern average. , this is the last election in which Pasquotank County voted for a Republican presidential candidate.

Results

Results by county

References

North Carolina
1988
1988 North Carolina elections